Tian Wenjing (1662 – December 24, 1732), styled Yiguang, was a prominent mandarin who lived during the reign of the Kangxi and Yongzheng Emperors of the Qing Dynasty.

Tian hailed from the Plain Yellow Banner of the Han Chinese military under the Qing Dynasty command. He was schooled in the Imperial Academy, and became a county official at the age of 21. In the last years of Kangxi's reign, Tian worked as a scholar in the imperial palace. It is not clear how his relationship with Yongzheng began. In 1734 after Yongzheng ascended the throne Tian was named governor of Henan, and was promoted to Governor-General (zongdu) several years later. He then served as Governor-General of Shandong, then Governor General of Beihe. Yongzheng held Tian in very high regard, writing that Tian devoted his life to serving the court and the state, and was morally upright and just. Tian retired in 1730, citing fatigue and illness.

Tian was interred at the Western Qing tombs, a very special honour, given that the tombs were generally reserved for royalty.

Popular culture
The 1998 hit TV series Yongzheng Dynasty depicted Tian as Yongzheng's foremost trusty fixer and lieutenant, being sent by Yongzheng to complete several missions in the south during flooding in the region. In the show, Tian's work in the south is used as a pretext for the eighth prince Yunsi to criticize the policies of Yongzheng. Historically, Wu Sidao or "Mr. Wu" actually served on the staff of Tian, but in the television series he was shown as Yongzheng's personal advisor prior to being recommended to Tian on advice from Li Wei. Tian also appeared in the 2002 TV series Grain Storage as a negative character.

References

1662 births
1732 deaths
Political office-holders in Shanxi
Political office-holders in Henan
Han Chinese Plain Yellow Bannermen